Chandrawati (3 September 1928 – 15 November 2020) was an Indian politician.

Early life
She was born in 1928, in Dalawas village, Bhiwani district, East Punjab. Her father, Hazarilal Sheoran, served in the Indian Army.

Political career
She was the first woman member of Haryana Vidhan Sabha and also the first woman member of parliament from Haryana. She was  Lieutenant Governor of Puducherry from 19 February 1990 to 18 December 1990. Earlier, she was a minister (1964–66 and 1972–74) in the Government of Haryana. In 1977, she was elected to the 6th Lok Sabha as MP for the Bhiwani constituency as a Janata Party candidate, defeating Defense Minister Bansi Lal. She died on 15 November 2020.

During 1964–66 and 1972–74 she was Minister of State in Haryana, 1977–79 President of Janata Party and 1982–85 Leader of the Opposition, and later a senior Indian National Congress leader in Haryana.

References

1928 births
2020 deaths
People from Bhiwani district
Lieutenant Governors of Puducherry
Women state governors of India
India MPs 1977–1979
Lok Sabha members from Haryana
Women in Puducherry politics
Janata Party politicians
Leaders of the Opposition in Haryana
Members of the Haryana Legislative Assembly
State cabinet ministers of Haryana
Indian National Congress politicians from Haryana
20th-century Indian women politicians
20th-century Indian politicians
Deaths from the COVID-19 pandemic in India
Lok Dal politicians
Women members of the Haryana Legislative Assembly